Wierzbica may refer to the following places:

Poland
Wierzbica, Gmina Leśniowice in Lublin Voivodeship (east Poland)
Wierzbica, Gmina Wierzbica in Lublin Voivodeship (east Poland)
Wierzbica, Krasnystaw County in Lublin Voivodeship (east Poland)
Wierzbica, Kraśnik County in Lublin Voivodeship (east Poland)
Wierzbica, Łódź Voivodeship (central Poland)
Wierzbica, Tomaszów Lubelski County in Lublin Voivodeship (east Poland)
Wierzbica, Miechów County in Lesser Poland Voivodeship (south Poland)
Wierzbica, Proszowice County in Lesser Poland Voivodeship (south Poland)
Wierzbica, Busko County in Świętokrzyskie Voivodeship (south-central Poland)
Wierzbica, Jędrzejów County in Świętokrzyskie Voivodeship (south-central Poland)
Wierzbica, Pińczów County in Świętokrzyskie Voivodeship (south-central Poland)
Wierzbica, Legionowo County in Masovian Voivodeship (east-central Poland)
Wierzbica, Radom County in Masovian Voivodeship (east-central Poland)
Wierzbica, Silesian Voivodeship (south Poland)
Wierzbica, Warmian-Masurian Voivodeship (north Poland)

Czech Republic
 Vrbice (Polish: Wierzbica), part of the town of Bohumín in the Czech Republic

See also
 Wierzbick
 Wierzbicka (disambiguation)